Liberty Township is one of fourteen townships in Carroll County, Indiana. As of the 2010 census, its population was 440 and it contained 195 housing units.

Geography

Unincorporated towns
 Burrows
 Flax (extinct)

Adjacent townships
 Jefferson Township, Cass County (north)
 Clinton Township, Cass County (northeast)
 Washington (east)
 Jackson (south)
 Adams (west)
 Rock Creek (west)

Major highways
  Indiana State Road 25

Cemeteries
The township contains two cemeteries, Burrows and Woodville.

References
 
 United States Census Bureau cartographic boundary files

External links
 Indiana Township Association
 United Township Association of Indiana

Townships in Carroll County, Indiana
Lafayette metropolitan area, Indiana
Townships in Indiana